Argyrarcha is a monotypic moth genus of the family Crambidae described by Eugene G. Munroe in 1974. Its only species, Argyrarcha margarita, described by William Warren in 1892, is found on Madagascar.

References

External links
Image at PlantSystematics.org

Crambidae genera
Moths of Madagascar
Moths of Africa
Eurrhypini
Monotypic moth genera
Taxa named by Eugene G. Munroe